Deglur (also locally known as Degloor) is a city and a municipal council in Nanded district in the state of Maharashtra, India. It is the largest tehsil of Nanded and is known for its socio-cultural history. The town was once part of erstwhile Nizam's  Hyderabad state. The town is situated on the river Lendi. Deglur has been known as a marketplace since ancient times.
apart from this most of the people from Telangana come to degloor for their essential services specifically for the medical related services.

Geography
Deglur is situated near where the Telangana, Maharashtra and Karnataka boundaries meet. The town borders several villages, including Taakli (North), Kawalgaon (West-South) and Mirzapur (East-South).
It is touching Telangana and Karnataka states.So people here can speak fluent Telugu and Kannada along with Marathi. Various castes people live in this region. Deglur maybe not the big city/town but the people here are so humble and polite to each other.

Economy
The primary occupation is agriculture (particularly farming), with output predominantly sugarcane, cotton, grains and bananas. The town is also known for its cloth market and gold jewellery.

Demography
As of the 2011 India census, Deglur has a population of 54,493, with males accounting for 51% of the population. Deglur City has an average literacy rate of 79%, lower than the national average of 82%, of which the male literacy rate is 86% and the female literacy rate is 72%. In Degloor, 14% of the population are under 6 years of age.

Attractions
The Hemadpanthi Temple (informally named Hottal), is a tourist attraction in the region. The Karadkhed Dam is near the town of Deglur. Rampur lake is situated near degloor city its distance from city is just 2 km . Varakari Shree Dhunda Maharaj Temple.

See also
Deglur Taluka
Deglur (Vidhan Sabha constituency)

References 

Cities and towns in Nanded district
Talukas in Maharashtra